Nelson Évora GCIH (born 20 April 1984) is an Ivory Coast-born Portuguese track and field athlete who specializes in the triple jump.

Évora is a former outdoor Olympic, World, and European triple jump champion. He has also won a European indoor title and the World indoor tour in triple jump. Évora competes at national level for Portugal and at club level for FC Barcelona. He represented Cape Verde until 2002, when he got Portuguese citizenship in June that year.

Biography
Born in Ouragahio, Ivory Coast, where his parents had come to live from Cape Verde, Évora and his family moved to Portugal when he was five years old. He still holds the Cape Verdean records in both the long jump (7.57 m) and the triple jump (16.15 m).

Évora's family settled in Odivelas, on the floor above João Ganço's—a former Portugal record-holder and the first Portuguese to pass over 2 meters in the high jump. Davide Ganço, one of João Ganço's three sons and one year older than Évora, became his best friend. One day, João Ganço, seeing them playing in the street, suggested that Évora started practising athletics, following Davide's example, and, just like that, Évora's sportive career started. João then became his coach.

Évora is a member of the Baháʼí Faith.

Sports career
He competed in the triple jump in the 2004 Olympics, without progressing from his pool, and finished sixth at the 2006 IAAF World Indoor Championships. He finished fourth in the triple jump final and sixth in the long jump final at the 2006 European Athletics Championships in Gothenburg, having set a Portuguese triple jump record of 17.23 metres during the qualification. At the 2007 European Athletics Indoor Championships he came in fifth place.

On 27 August 2007, Évora became the triple jump world champion at the 2007 World Championships, in Osaka, Japan, establishing his personal best (Portuguese national record until May 2018) and second best world mark of the year at 17.74 metres.

On 9 March 2008, Évora placed third in the triple jump competition at the 2008 IAAF World Indoor Championships, in Valencia, by jumping 17.27 metres.

On 21 August 2008, he edged out Phillips Idowu of Great Britain and Leevan Sands of the Bahamas to take an Olympic gold medal with a 17.67 metres jump.

Évora set the world leading mark at the Grande Prêmio Brasil Caixa in May 2009, winning with 17.66 m. He was pleased with the jump (his third best performance ever) and stated his intention to surpass the 18 metre mark at the forthcoming 2009 World Championships. In mid-2009, he won the triple jump gold at the Universiade and another at the 2009 Lusophony Games.

However he was unable to replicate his winning form at the 2009 World Championships in Berlin, being relegated to second place. After leading with a first round jump of 17.55 m, the man he beat in the Olympics, Phillips Idowu, was able to take the gold with a third round jump of 17.73 m, the longest in the world for that year.

Évora represented F. C. Porto from 2002 to 2004, S.L. Benfica from 2004 to 2016 and Sporting Clube de Portugal from 2016 to 2020. Since 2020 he is an athlete of FC Barcelona.

Personal bests

High jump – 2.07 m (2005)
Long jump – 8.10 m (2007)
Triple jump – 17.74 m (2007)

International competitions

Orders
 Grand Cross of the Order of Prince Henry (Portugal, 27 May 2015)
 Grand Cross of the Order of Merit (Portugal, 30 August 2018)

References

External links

  
 
 
 
 
  

1984 births
Living people
Portuguese male long jumpers
Portuguese male triple jumpers
Cape Verdean emigrants to Portugal
People from Odivelas
Portuguese people of Ivorian descent
Athletes (track and field) at the 2004 Summer Olympics
Athletes (track and field) at the 2008 Summer Olympics
Athletes (track and field) at the 2016 Summer Olympics
Athletes (track and field) at the 2020 Summer Olympics
Olympic gold medalists for Portugal
Olympic athletes of Portugal
Portuguese Bahá'ís
Place of birth missing (living people)
20th-century Bahá'ís
World Athletics Championships medalists
Medalists at the 2008 Summer Olympics
S.L. Benfica athletes
World Athletics Championships athletes for Portugal
Olympic gold medalists in athletics (track and field)
Universiade medalists in athletics (track and field)
Olympic male triple jumpers
Universiade gold medalists for Portugal
European Athletics Championships winners
Black Portuguese sportspeople
World Athletics Championships winners
Medalists at the 2011 Summer Universiade
Medalists at the 2009 Summer Universiade